Robert Urbanek (born 29 April 1987) is a Polish athlete specializing in the discus throw.  His personal best in the event is 66.93 meters, achieved in 2012 in Halle.

He competed for Poland at the 2012 Summer Olympics, failing to qualify for the final. His biggest achievement to date is the bronze medal at the 2015 World Championships in Beijing.

Competition record

Progression
2006 – 50.84
2007 – 56.18
2008 – 62.22
2009 – 60.54
2010 – 60.74
2011 – 64.37
2012 – 66.93
2013 – 65.30
2014 – 65.75
2015 – 66.31
2016 – 65.56
2017 – 66.73
2018 – 65.15
2019 – 65.81

References

External links
 

Polish male discus throwers
Athletes (track and field) at the 2012 Summer Olympics
Athletes (track and field) at the 2016 Summer Olympics
Olympic athletes of Poland
1987 births
People from Łęczyca
Living people
Sportspeople from Łódź Voivodeship
World Athletics Championships athletes for Poland
European Athletics Championships medalists
World Athletics Championships medalists